The Old US 67 Rest Area is a historic roadside rest area in rural Clark County, Arkansas. It is located in on the west side of U.S. Route 67 (US 67) and an old paved section formerly designated Highway 51, between the small towns of Curtis and Gum Springs. The rest area consists of a semicircular fieldstone retaining wall, which is segmented by six fieldstone pillars. A semicircular concrete bench stands facing a fieldstone well. The rest area was built five years after US 67 was paved in 1931, by the National Youth Administration, a federal New Deal agency, and the state highway department.

Near the third pillar is a plaque which says:

The rest area was listed on the National Register of Historic Places in 2006.

See also
National Register of Historic Places listings in Clark County, Arkansas

References

Transportation on the National Register of Historic Places in Arkansas
Buildings and structures completed in 1936
Transportation in Clark County, Arkansas
U.S. Route 67
National Register of Historic Places in Clark County, Arkansas
Road transportation infrastructure on the National Register of Historic Places
National Youth Administration
Rest areas in the United States